Pearl Street Station was the first commercial central power plant in the United States. The station was built by the Edison Illuminating Company, under the direction of Francis Upton, hired by Thomas Edison.

History 
Pearl Street Station consumed coal for fuel; it began with six 100 kW dynamos, and it started generating electricity on September 4, 1882, serving an initial load of 400 lamps at 82 customers. By 1884, Pearl Street Station was serving 508 customers with 10,164 lamps.   The station was originally powered by custom-made Porter-Allen high-speed steam engines designed to provide 175 horsepower at 700 rpm, but these proved to be unreliable with their sensitive governors. They were removed and replaced with new engines from Armington & Sims that proved to be much more suitable for Edison's dynamos. Pearl Street Station was also the world's first cogeneration plant.  While the steam engines provided grid electricity, Edison made use of the thermal byproduct by providing steam heating to local manufacturers and nearby buildings on the same Manhattan block.

Pearl Street Station served what was known as the "First District" (bounded clockwise from north by Spruce Street, the East River, Wall Street, and Nassau Street). The district, so named because of its importance in the history of electric power, contained several other power stations such as the Excelsior Power Company Building. The station burned down in 1890, destroying all but one dynamo that is now kept in the Greenfield Village Museum in Dearborn, Michigan. It was rebuilt, and ran till 1895, when it was decommissioned, since larger and more efficient plants had been built nearby.

Scale models
In 1929 the Edison Company constructed three scale working models of the station. When a button was pushed, a motor turned the engines, generators, and other equipment in the model. A set of lamps connected to labelled buttons identified the various areas of the building. Cut-outs in the side of the model building allowed examination of the boilers on the first level, reciprocating steam engines and dynamos on the reinforced second level, and the control and test gear on the third and fourth levels. The models were constructed to a scale of one-half inch to the foot and were 62 inches long, 34 inches high and 13 inches wide. The models still exist and are on display at the Smithsonian Institution's National Museum of American History in Washington, D.C.; at the Consolidated Edison Learning Center in Long Island City, New York; and at the Henry Ford Museum in Dearborn, Michigan. Up to 31 people worked on constructing the models which took about 6 months to complete.

See also

Holborn Viaduct power station
Schuyler Wheeler
War of the currents
Schoellkopf Power Station - Direct current at Niagara Falls

References

External links

Pearl Street Station from the IEEE Global History Network
Edison: His Life and Inventions
Industrial Motor Power Corp., What is Cogeneration?
Edison Electric Institute. History of the Electric Power Industry. Retrieved 13 April 2005.
Smithsonian Institution. Emergence of Electrical Utilities in America. Retrieved 13 April 2005.

Coal-fired power stations in New York (state)
Consolidated Edison
Demolished buildings and structures in Manhattan
Energy infrastructure completed in 1882
Financial District, Manhattan
Former coal-fired power stations in the United States
Former power stations in New York City